The Mount Miriam Cancer Hospital is a non-profit cancer-dedicated hospital near George Town in Penang, Malaysia. Located at the Tanjung Bungah suburb, the 40-bed hospital was founded in 1976 and offers specialist treatments for cancer patients, including tomotherapy, radiosurgery and chemotherapy.

History 
Mount Miriam Cancer Hospital was established by six Catholic nuns of the Franciscan Missionaries of the Divine Motherhood. The construction of the hospital began in 1974 and whilst waiting for the hospital's occupancy certificate, the nuns took the initiative to collect public donations for the project. The hospital was opened in 1976.

Initially, Mount Miriam Cancer Hospital focused on palliative care of late-stage cancer patients. In 1979, the then Chief Ministers of Penang, Lim Chong Eu, declared the opening of its Outpatient Complex and Radiotherapy Unit. Within the year, the hospital also obtained its first radiotherapy machine.

Further developments included the completion of a day chemotherapy unit in 1999 and a palliative outpatient clinic in 2001.

Services 
The hospital specialises in cancer treatments, including the following services.
 Tomotherapy
 Stereotactic radiosurgery
 Intensity modulated radiotherapy
 Image-guided radiotherapy
 3D conformal radiotherapy
 3D brachytherapy
 Chemotherapy
 Oncology
 Palliative care

See also 
 List of hospitals in Malaysia

References 

Hospitals in Penang
Hospitals established in 1976